Tyler Patrick Jones (born March 12, 1994) is an American actor known for his recurring role as Ned Banks on the CBS television show Ghost Whisperer.

Filmography

Commercials
 Hallmark (2001) – Daniel
 Macy's Super Saturday Sale (2002)
 Home Depot (2003)
 Walt Disney World: Magical Gatherings (2003)
 Yahoo (2006)
 Dairy Queen (2008)

References

External links
Official website

1994 births
Living people
Male actors from California
American male child actors
American male film actors
American male television actors
21st-century American male actors